Mangelia phrixae is an extinct species of sea snail, a marine gastropod mollusk in the family Mangeliidae.

Description
The length of the shell attains , its diameter .

Distribution
This extinct marine species was found in Miocene strata in the Alum Bluff Group, Florida, United States.

References

External links
 Worldwide Mollusc Species Data Base: Mangelia phrixae

phrixae
Gastropods described in 1937